Julie London is an LP album by Julie London, released by Liberty Records under catalog number LRP-3342 as a monophonic recording and catalog number LST-7342 in stereo in 1964. It was arranged by Ernie Freeman; with Dave Hassinger as the engineer.

This Julie London album is commonly mistaken to be entitled as "You Don't Have to Be a Baby to Cry", due to mistitling on the album jacket's spine. This error had already happened previously with her 1963 album, The End of the World, when it was mistitled as "The Good Life" on the album jacket's spine.

Track listing

Personnel 
 Julie London – vocals
 Plas Johnson – tenor saxophone
 Jack Sheldon – trumpet
 Ernie Freeman – arranger, conductor

References 
 
 

Liberty Records albums
1964 albums
Julie London albums
Albums arranged by Ernie Freeman
Albums produced by Snuff Garrett